This is a list of schools in Kuala Lumpur, Malaysia. It is categorised according to the variants of schools in Malaysia, and is arranged alphabetically.

Chinese type primary and secondary schools

Chinese Primary School

 Sekolah Jenis Kebangsaan (C) Chi Man
 Sekolah Jenis Kebangsaan (C) Chiao Nan
 Sekolah Jenis Kebangsaan (C) Chin Woo
 Sekolah Jenis Kebangsaan (C) Chong Fah Phit Chee
 Sekolah Jenis Kebangsaan (C) Chong Hwa
 Sekolah Jenis Kebangsaan (C) Choong Wen
 Sekolah Jenis Kebangsaan (C) Chung Hwa (P)
 Sekolah Jenis Kebangsaan (C) Chung Kwo
 Sekolah Jenis Kebangsaan (C) Chung Kwok
 Sekolah Jenis Kebangsaan (C) Confucian
 Sekolah Jenis Kebangsaan (C) Jalan Davidson
 Sekolah Jenis Kebangsaan (C) Jalan Imbi
 Sekolah Jenis Kebangsaan (C) Jinjang Selatan
 Sekolah Jenis Kebangsaan (C) Jinjang Tengah (1)
 Sekolah Jenis Kebangsaan (C) Jinjang Tengah (2)
 Sekolah Jenis Kebangsaan (C) Jinjang Utara
 Sekolah Jenis Kebangsaan (C) Kepong (1)
 Sekolah Jenis Kebangsaan (C) Kepong (2)
 Sekolah Jenis Kebangsaan (C) Khai Chee
 Sekolah Jenis Kebangsaan (C) Kuen Cheng (1)
 Sekolah Jenis Kebangsaan (C) Kuen Cheng (2)
 Sekolah Jenis Kebangsaan (C) Kung Min
 Sekolah Jenis Kebangsaan (C) Kwong Hon
 Sekolah Jenis Kebangsaan (C) La Salle
 Sekolah Jenis Kebangsaan (C) Lai Chee
 Sekolah Jenis Kebangsaan (C) Lai Meng
 Sekolah Jenis Kebangsaan (C) Mun Choong
 Sekolah Jenis Kebangsaan (C) Mun Yee
 Sekolah Jenis Kebangsaan (C) Naam Kheung
 Sekolah Jenis Kebangsaan (C) Nan Kai
 Sekolah Jenis Kebangsaan (C) Nan Yik (Lee Rubber)
 Sekolah Jenis Kebangsaan (C) Salak Selatan
 Sekolah Jenis Kebangsaan (C) Sam Yoke
 Sekolah Jenis Kebangsaan (C) Sentul
 Sekolah Jenis Kebangsaan (C) Sentul Pasar
 Sekolah Jenis Kebangsaan (C) St. Theresa
 Sekolah Jenis Kebangsaan (C) Tai Thung
 Sekolah Jenis Kebangsaan (C) Taman Connaught
 Sekolah Jenis Kebangsaan (C) Tsun Jin
 Sekolah Jenis Kebangsaan (C) Yoke Nam
 Sekolah Jenis Kebangsaan (C) Kepong (3)

Sekolah Kebangsaan-Government type primary and secondary school

Sekolah Rendah Kebangsaan
 Sekolah Kebangsaan Alam Damai
 Sekolah Kebangsaan Au Keramat
 Sekolah Kebangsaan Bandar Baru Sentul
 Sekolah Kebangsaan Bandar Baru Seri Petaling (1) (SKBBSP1)
Sekolah Kebangsaan Bandar Baru Seri Petaling (2) (SKBBSP2)
 Sekolah Kebangsaan Bandar Tasik Selatan
 Sekolah Kebangsaan Batu Empat(1) Jalan Ipoh
 Sekolah Kebangsaan Batu Empat(2) Jalan Ipoh
 Sekolah Kebangsaan Bukit Bandaraya, Bangsar
 Sekolah Kebangsaan Bukit Damansara
 Sekolah Kebangsaan Desa Pandan (SKDP)
 Sekolah Kebangsaan Kepong Baru
 Sekolah Kebangsaan Kiaramas
 Sekolah Kebangsaan Puteri Pandan 1 & 2
 Sekolah Kebangsaan Saint Gabriel (SKSG)
 Sekolah Kebangsaan Seri Anggerik
 SK Setapak Indah (formerly known as SK Seri Melati)
 Sekolah Kebangsaan Seri Bintang Selatan
 Sekolah Kebangsaan Seri Bintang Utara (SKSBU)
 Sekolah Kebangsaan Seri Mega
 Sekolah Kebangsaan Seri Setia
 Sekolah Kebangsaan Sungai Besi
 Sekolah Kebangsaan Taman Bukit Maluri, Kepong (SKTBM)
 Sekolah Kebangsaan Taman Kepong
 Sekolah Kebangsaan Taman Maluri (SKTM)
 Sekolah Kebangsaan Taman Midah (1) (SKTM 1)
 Sekolah Kebangsaan Taman Midah (2) (SKTM 2)
 Sekolah Kebangsaan Taman Segar, Jalan Manis, Cheras
 Sekolah Kebangsaan Taman Tun Dr. Ismail 1 (SKTTDI 1)
 Sekolah Kebangsaan Taman Tun Dr. Ismail 2 (SKTTDI 2)
 Sekolah Kebangsaan Lelaki Methodist, K.L.
 Sekolah Kebangsaan Lelaki Methodist, Sentul
 Sekolah Kebangsaan Wangsa Jaya, Setapak (SKWJ)
 SRA Taman Tun Dr. Ismail
 Sekolah Rendah Taman Ilmu dan Budi (Setia Budi)

Secondary education: Sekolah Menengah Kebangsaan (SMK)

Private schools

Chinese Independent High School
 Confucian Private Secondary School
 Chong Hwa Independent High School
 Kuen Cheng High School
 Tsun Jin High School

International schools
 Alice Smith International School - Primary Campus is in Kuala Lumpur while the secondary campus is in Selangor.
 Cempaka International Ladies' College (CILC)
 Cempaka International School Cheras (CIS)
 Cempaka International School Damansara Heights
 Sekolah Menengah Kebangsaan Convent Sentul (known as SMKCS or CS)
 EtonHouse International School Malaysia
 elc International school
 Epsom College in Malaysia [ECIM] International School
 Fairview International School
 French School of Kuala Lumpur Henri Fauconnier (LFKL)
 Garden International School (GIS)
 Global Indian International School (Kuala Lumpur)
 Hi-5 House of Learning Preschool, Kuala Lumpur
 IGB International School (IGBIS)
 International Islamic School
 Itqan Integrated School (ITQAN)
 International School of Kuala Lumpur (ISKL)
 International School, Kota Damansara]
 Marefat International School
 Matrix International School
 Methodist Boys' School (Kuala Lumpur)
 Mont Kiara International School
 Mutiara International Grammar School
 Nexus International School Malaysia
 Real International School (Kuala Lumpur)
 Regent International School, Klang
 Regent International School, Kuantan
 Regent International School, Puchong
 Regent International School, Sungai Petani
 Rocklin International School, Kuala Lumpur
 Royal Military College, Kuala Lumpur
 Sayfol International School
 Sekolah Seri Suria
 Spectrum International Islamic School (SIIS)
 Sekolah Sri Bestari, Bandar Sri Damansara, Kuala Lumpur
 Sri Dasmesh International School (SDIS)
 Sri Kuala Lumpur
 Sri Sempurna International School
 St. John's International School
 St Joseph Institution International Malaysia
 Tanarata International Schools
 Taylor's International School
 Time International School
 Utama International School (UIS)
 UCSI International School
 Victoria International School (VIS), Banting
 Wesley Methodist School Kuala Lumpur (International) (WMSKL(I))

Note that the following are in Selangor and not in Kuala Lumpur proper:
 Australian International School, Malaysia
 British School, Kuala Lumpur

Expatriate schools (school code)
 DARUL HIKMAH IRAQI SCHOOL	BVSH002
 IRAQI EXPATRIATE SCHOOL	BVSD003	
 Saudi Schools in Kuala Lumpur BVSD002
 French School of Kuala Lumpur (Lycée français de Kuala Lumpur)	WVS0002	
 French School of Kuala Lumpur HEVEA WVS0006	
 SEKOLAH EKSPATRIAT IRAN (IRAN EXPATRIATE SCHOOL)	WVS0004
 SEKOLAH EKSPATRIAT IRAN, KUALA LUMPUR	WVS0007	
 Sekolah Indonesia Kuala Lumpur WVS0003	
 THE LIBYAN EXPATRIATE SCHOOL	WVS0005

Note that several expatriate schools are in Selangor and not in Kuala Lumpur proper: 
 Chinese Taipei School Kuala Lumpur (BVSA001)
 German School Kuala Lumpur (BVSJ001)
 Japanese School of Kuala Lumpur (BVSH001)
 Korean School of Malaysia (BVSI001)

Footnotes

Kuala Lumpur